Colts Neck High School is a four-year comprehensive public high school located in Colts Neck Township, in Monmouth County, New Jersey, United States, serving students in ninth through twelfth grades and operating as one of the six secondary schools of the Freehold Regional High School District. The school is located at the corner of County Route 537 and Five Points Road. The school serves students from all of Colts Neck Township and from portions of both Howell Township and Marlboro Township. The school has been accredited by the Middle States Association of Colleges and Schools Commission on Elementary and Secondary Schools since 2008.

As of the 2021–22 school year, the school had an enrollment of 1,347 students and 92.2 classroom teachers (on an FTE basis), for a student–teacher ratio of 14.6:1. There were 114 students (8.5% of enrollment) eligible for free lunch and 39 (2.9% of students) eligible for reduced-cost lunch.

The school's mascot is the cougar, which was chosen collectively by the student body in a competition. The school's motto is "Let The Tradition Begin."

History
The earliest proposal for a high school in Colts Neck dates back to a May 1978 referendum that would have included a high school building in the township at a cost of $17 million (equivalent to $ million in ), which was approved by Colts Neck voters but was overwhelmingly rejected by voters in the seven other constituent municipalities. In 1983, there was active consideration of having Colts Neck withdraw from the regional high school system, while the district considered renaming Marlboro High School, which was attended by Colts Neck students, as Marlboro-Colts Neck High School.

A  site was identified in 1986 as part of a project that would create a new Colts Neck High School that would cost an estimated $30 million (equivalent to $ million in ) and could accommodate 1,300 students and would also expand other district facilities at a total cost of $36 million. In September 1986, voters approved the referendum by a 58%-42% margin, with Colts Neck residents providing much of the margin for passage. By 1988, the costs of construction of the new high school had soared by millions of dollars, exceeding the amount available from the referendum to cover the costs, leading to further delays. In February 1993, a judge ruled that the district had to move forward with construction of the new high school and could not put forth a referendum to undo the 1986 vote. In July 1994, the New Jersey Supreme Court refused to hear the case.

Construction began in August 1996, with expectations to have the building open in September 1998 to handle 750 incoming students, with an eventual capacity for 1,300.

The school opened in September 1998 as the sixth high school in the system, with 380 students in ninth and tenth grades.

Awards, recognition and rankings
The school was the 68th-ranked public high school in New Jersey out of 339 schools statewide in New Jersey Monthly magazine's September 2014 cover story on the state's "Top Public High Schools", using a new ranking methodology. The school had been ranked 103rd in the state of 328 schools in 2012, after being ranked 80th in 2010 out of 322 schools listed. The magazine ranked the school 109th in the magazine's September 2008 issue, which surveyed 316 schools across the state.

Schooldigger.com ranked the school tied for 72nd out of 381 public high schools statewide in its 2011 rankings (an increase of 61 positions from the 2010 ranking) which were based on the combined percentage of students classified as proficient or above proficient on the mathematics (89.4%) and language arts literacy (96.7%) components of the High School Proficiency Assessment (HSPA).

Campus
Colts Neck High School is the only school in the district that is fully climate-controlled and is one of the largest schools in New Jersey consisting of two floors. The school underwent a large expansion in 2002 that increased the size of the building by roughly one third. The school has two gyms, the larger one being used for all varsity teams seating 3,000. The auditorium holds a total of about 1,750 people which is used for assemblies and the schools' arts program. There is also a transportable courtroom used by the Law and Public Service program and the Mock Trial team. The musicals and plays are also a very big part of the school and there is usually a great turnout for each performance. The fields include soccer, track, football stadium and practice fields, lacrosse, and baseball fields. Other features include a large eight-mat wrestling room, five tennis courts, a large gymnastics room, four team rooms and film rooms, and a weight room.

Magnet programs
There are two magnet programs that students attending the Freehold Regional High School District can apply for.

Naval JROTC Leadership & Character Development Academy
The Colts Neck High School NJROTC is a four-year course of study, which encompasses three main subject areas: Leadership, Naval Science, and Physical Training. The Leadership curriculum develops skills in study, time management, and personal leadership, as well as self-discipline and self-reliance. The roles and capabilities of the U.S. Armed Forces, particularly sea power, shipboard life, national security and naval history are reviewed. Cadets learn military customs, courtesies, drills, ceremonies and respect for the flag, and develop a sense of patriotism through community and school service. The leadership value of fitness is reinforced with weekly physical training. This is an opportunity for students to develop leadership qualities in a nurturing and exciting environment.  The cadets are also able to take part in unique and adventurous opportunities such as orienteering, drill, visiting naval bases, and many other activities. They have been Area 4 Academic, Athletic, and Drill champions for ten years in a row.

Law and Public Service Learning Center
The Center for Law and Public Service, located at Colts Neck High School, is a four-year program for students with demonstrated interests and abilities in history, politics, government, law, volunteerism and leadership. Targeted skills for development include problem solving, critical thinking and reading, written and oral communication, research, and organization. The values of citizenship, justice, and service serve as the foundation for academic study. Students study history as it relates to the development of the US and the evolution of world societies and governments, as well as political thought, ethical philosophy, and leadership theory. Special attention is given to NJ history and civic affairs. Courses include: Honors Speech, Debate and Dramatic Arts Workshop, Honors World Literature and Writer's Workshop, Honors Comparative Civilizations, Honors American Literature and Research Workshop, AP Civitas, Honors U.S. History I, AP U.S. History, Honors Legal and Fiscal Theory, Honors Senior Seminar, and Honors Business and Contract Law.

Athletics
The Colts Neck High School Cougars compete in Division B North of the Shore Conference, an athletic conference comprised of public and private high schools in Monmouth and Ocean counties along the Jersey Shore. The league operates under the jurisdiction of the New Jersey State Interscholastic Athletic Association (NJSIAA). With 1,027 students in grades 10–12, the school was classified by the NJSIAA for the 2019–20 school year as Group III for most athletic competition purposes, which included schools with an enrollment of 761 to 1,058 students in that grade range. The school was classified by the NJSIAA as Group IV South for football for 2018–2020. Since the school opened in 2001, it has won numerous state, sectional, county, conference, and division titles.

The school participates with Raritan High School in a joint ice hockey team in which Freehold High School is the host school / lead agency. The co-op program operates under agreements scheduled to expire at the end of the 2023–24 school year.

Girls' soccer
In 2015, the girls' soccer team finished the season with a record of 24–0–1, winning the first Shore Conference title and the first state title for girls' soccer, defeating nationally top ranked Northern Highlands Regional High School by a score of 1–0 in the tournament final to win the Group III state championship.

Girls' basketball
The girls' basketball program set a single season record for wins in 2009 and won the Group IV state championship, defeating Columbia High School by a score of 58–52 in the tournament final. The team finished the season with a 29–4 record after losing in the finals of the Tournament of Champions by a score of 56–44 to St. John Vianney High School, which won their sixth Tournament of Champions title. In 2008 they won the Shore Conference Tournament with a 55–47 win over Rumson-Fair Haven Regional High School in triple overtime, the first public high school to win the conference title since 1989.

Girls bowling
The girls bowling team won the Group II state championship in 2019.

Girls field hockey
The 2017 field hockey team won the North II Group III state sectional championship with a 2–0 victory against Freehold High School.

Cross country / track & field
The cross country running and track program (in particular distance running) has been one of the school's most successful teams. The girls' cross country team has been nationally ranked three times, during the 2005, 2006 and 2007 seasons. The team also qualified for Nike Team Nationals in 2006 and finished 4th with Ashley Higginson (1st place), Briana Jackucewicz, Allison Donaghy, Kristen O'Dowd, Erin Donaghy, Allie Flott, Morgan Clark, and Allison Linnell (Linnell attended MAST.) This 2006 girls' team had wins at the 2006 Shore Conference, Monmouth County, Central Jersey Group IV, NJ Group IV, and NJ Meet of Champions.  The cross country program also has produced three Foot Locker finalists (Briana Jackucewicz, Craig Forys, and Ashley Higginson).

The girls won state group team titles in Group I in 2000, in Group III in 2005 and 2016–2018, and in Group IV in 2006.

The boys won the state Group III title in 2016.

The indoor and outdoor track and field program has also been extremely successful having won six national titles, the boys indoor distance medley relay 2005, girls indoor 4 x  Relay 2006 & 2007, boys indoor 2 mile (Craig Forys) 2007, girls indoor and outdoor 2 mile (Ashley Higginson) 2007. The track program also has produced numerous state champions and has held numerous state records, the most notable being the boys' 4 x 800 relay set in 2005 with a time of 7:39.54. Craig Forys set the New Jersey State 3000 meters and two-mile (3.2 km) records and Ashley Higginson set the New Jersey State 2 mile, 5000 meter and 2000 meter steeplechase records. The boys have won state group team titles in indoor track in Group III in 2016 and 2017.

Boys' lacrosse
The boys lacrosse team won the 2015-16 Public A North championship.

Boys' basketball
In the 2015–16 season the boys' basketball team captured its first state title, defeating crosstown rival Freehold Township High School by a score of 45–44 in the Central Jersey Group IV tournament final.

Boys' soccer
The team won the Group I championship in 2000, defeating runner-up Whippany Park High School by a score of 4–2 in the tournament final.

Administration
The school's principal is Dr. Brian P. Donahue. His core administration team includes two assistant principals.

Other high schools in the district
Attendance at each of the district's high schools is based on where the student lives in relation to the district's high schools. While many students attend the school in their hometown, others attend a school located outside their own municipality. In order to balance enrollment, district lines are redrawn for the six schools to address issues with overcrowding and spending in regards to transportation. The other five schools in the district (with 2021–22 enrollment data from the National Center for Education Statistics) with their attendance zones for incoming students are:
 Freehold High School - 1,411 students from Freehold (all) and Freehold Township (part).
 Freehold Township High School - 2,007 students from Freehold Township (part), Howell (part), Manalapan (part).
 Howell High School - 2,055 students from Farmingdale (all) and Howell (part).
 Manalapan High School - 1,756 students from Englishtown (all) and Manalapan (part).
 Marlboro High School - 1,837 students from Marlboro (part).

Notable alumni
 Jake Areman (born 1996), soccer player who plays for the Tampa Bay Rowdies in the USL Championship.
 Anthony DeSclafani (born 1990), MLB pitcher for the San Francisco Giants.
 Ashley Higginson (born 1989), middle-distance runner who won the gold medal in the 3000 meter steeplechase at the 2015 Pan American Games.
 Otandeka Laki (born 1996), footballer who plays as a winger and a striker for the Uganda women's national team.

References

External links 
 Colts Neck High School website
 Freehold Regional High School District website
 Colts Neck High School N.J.R.O.T.C website
 
 School Data for the Freehold Regional High School District, National Center for Education Statistics

Colts Neck Township, New Jersey
Howell Township, New Jersey
Marlboro Township, New Jersey
1998 establishments in New Jersey
Educational institutions established in 1998
Middle States Commission on Secondary Schools
Public high schools in Monmouth County, New Jersey
Magnet schools in New Jersey